Similkameen may refer to:

 Similkameen Country or Similkameen District, or  "the Similkameen", a historical georegion in British Columbia, Canada
 Similkameen River, a river that runs through southern British Columbia, discharging into the Okanogan River near Oroville, Washington, United States
 Similkameen people, or Similkameens, a branch of the Salishan-speaking Okanagan people
Lower Similkameen Indian Band, a First Nations government
Upper Similkameen Indian Band
 Similkameen (electoral district), a defunct provincial electoral district in British Columbia, Canada
 Boundary-Similkameen, a defunct provincial electoral district in British Columbia
 Regional District of Okanagan-Similkameen, a regional district in British Columbia
 Okanagan—Similkameen, a defunct federal electoral district in British Columbia
 Okanagan—Similkameen—Merritt, a defunct Canadian federal electoral district in British Columbia